James "Jim" Sutherland Lawson (born 6 May 1934) is an Australian public health doctor and scientist, known for research on breast cancer and for public health services and prevention programs, currently in use in Australian and international public health services.

Early life

Jim Lawson is the youngest of three children of Jack and Kitty Lawson of Castlemaine, Victoria and the grandson of Harry Lawson, the 27th Premier of Victoria. During the Second World War, Lawson attended the local primary and high school, then he was sent as a boarder to the private Scotch College in Melbourne. Subsequently, he began medical studies at the University of Melbourne, completed with the prize in surgery and a top place as an intern at the Royal Melbourne Hospital. Following his interest in child health, Lawson began training at Melbourne's Royal Children's Hospital.

In 1961, he joined an International Red Cross expedition to the Congo. There he managed together with Gerry Joyce (another Australian surgeon) a District Hospital that had been abandoned by the Belgians following the Congo independence movement and revolution. The context was difficult, as a result of the period of turmoil of those years.

Afterwards, he came back to the children's hospital, where he met (and married nine months later) his future wife, Margaret Ralton.

Papua New Guinea

Soon after their wedding, Lawson and Margaret left for Port Moresby in Papua New Guinea. There he managed the children's ward of the local hospital. Lawson was later awarded a Doctorate in Medicine for his research into the best ways of treating Papuan children suffering from a range of infectious conditions, including pneumonia, diarrhoeal disease and meningitis.

Australian health system management

Lawson and his family returned to Melbourne, following his appointment as Medical Director of the Western General Hospital. He later moved to Hobart, as Director of Tasmanian Hospital and Health Services. During these years, he became involved in activism, writing and publishing reformist books and articles concerning ways of improving the hospital and health system.

In 1974, Lawson was named Director of Health for Northern Sydney. Here he developed a range of innovative services, which were afterwards introduced as a standard part of both Australian and international public health services:
 the organisation of co-ordinated hospital and health services on a community wide basis,
 the provision of expert hospital emergency services in place of trainee medical officer based services,
 development of co-ordinated rehabilitation and geriatric services.

He also introduced a series of public health prevention programs, including
 mandatory safety architectural glass in windows and doors to reduce profound lacerations,
 safe children's playgrounds,
 safety fences around private swimming pools,
 safe rules for rugby players to prevent quadriplegic neck injuries,
 health promotion among isolated rural Aboriginal communities in New South Wales,
 the successful development of groups as a means of improving social relationships among Australian mothers of new born infants(Lawson & Callaghan 1991).

Academia
In 1987 Lawson was recruited by the University of New South Wales and as Head of the School of Public Health, he introduced Master of Public Health programs into the Medical Faculty at this University. During the initial AIDS epidemic of 1983, together with other colleagues, he met and talked to drug users, documenting the sharing of a single intravenous needle as the main factor in the rapid spread of the disease.

Breast and prostate cancer research

In 1998, one of Lawson's post graduate students noted the strikingly lower risk of breast cancer among Asian as compared to Western women and the fact that this risk rose rapidly when Asian women migrated to the West. Lawson initiated further research, the first Australian investigations into viruses as potential causes of human breast cancer. The innovative outcomes of this research are:
 the first identification by molecular methods of mouse mammary tumor viruses (MMTV), the known cause of breast cancer in mice, in human milk,
 the first identification of high risk human papilloma viruses (HPVs, the known cause of cervical cancer) in human breast cancer cell cultures,
 the first identification of HPV associated koilocytes (abnormal precancerous cells specific to HPV infections) in human breast tumors,
 the development of unambiguous evidence that high risk HPVs are present in human breast cancer and that they have oncogenic characteristics,
 the unambiguous evidence that MMTV is located in breast cancer cell nuclei and is associated with high expression of the oncogene WNT1,
 the first indication that some breast cancers may be as a consequence of sexually transmitted HPVs,
 the development of evidence which contradicts the traditional scientific wisdom that breast feeding is not associated with breast cancer,
 the development of evidence that localised breast cancers may have systemic influences in skin and hair,
 the first recognition that some MMTV positive breast cancers may have similar morphology (microscopic appearances) to MMTV positive mouse mammary tumors,
 contradiction of the scientific belief that estrogen receptor expression in normal breast tissues is higher in breast cancer of Western as compared to Asian women thus supporting the use of tamoxifen as a treatment for breast cancer in Asia.

This research had shown that human papilloma virus and mouse mammary tumor viruses are present in up to half of all breast cancers in Western women.

Together with his grandmother colleague Wendy Glenn also of the University of New South Wales, Sydney, Australia, he has published evidence that mouse mammary tumour virus and human papilloma virus are highly likely to have causal roles in human breast cancer. Together with Gertrude Buehring of the University of California at Berkeley, Lawson has contributed to research into Bovine leukemia virus which may also have a role in human breast cancer.

Lawson has also worked on the infectious causes of heart attacks. He has published the hypothesis that food and infections combine to initiate atheromatous cardiovascular disease (the origins of heart attacks) in childhood! This is of crucial and ground breaking importance because heart attacks are the biggest killer of all.

Now aged 88, he has a new book to published in late 2022  "Catching Breast Cancer". It will be available on Amazon Kindle.

Books
Lawson has written 9 books, including

Awards

Journal articles
Lawson has written over 200 journal articles

Lawson JS, Glenn WK. Evidence for a causal role by mouse mammary tumour-like virus in human breast cancer. npj Breast Cancer. 2019 Nov 7;5:40. doi: 10.1038/s41523-019-0136-4.PMID 31728407
Lawson JS, Glenn WK. Evidence for a causal role by human papillomaviruses in prostate cancer - a systematic review. Infect Agent Cancer. 2020 Jul 14;15:41. doi: 10.1186/s13027-020-003058.PMID 32684946
Lawson JS, Glenn WK. Catching viral breast cancer. Infect Agent Cancer. 2021 Jun 10;16(1):37. doi: 10.1186/s13027-021-00366-3.PMID 34108009
Lawson JS, Glenn WK. Infection and food combine to cause atherosclerotic coronary heart disease. Int J Cardiol Heart Vasc. 2021 Jul 6;35:100807. doi: 10.1016/j.ijcha.2021.100807.PMID 34286061
Lawson JS, Glenn WK. Mouse Mammary Tumour Virus (MMTV) in Human Breast Cancer. Viruses. 2022 Mar 30;14(4):721. doi: 10.3390/v14040721.PMID 35458452

References

1934 births
Australian health activists
Australian medical researchers
Australian surgeons
Living people
Melbourne Medical School alumni
People educated at Scotch College, Melbourne
Academic staff of the University of New South Wales